The 2007 Supercupa României was the 10th edition of Romania's season opener cup competition. The match was played in Bucharest at Stadionul Naţional on 25 July 2007, and was contested between Liga I title holders, FC Dinamo București and Cupa României champions, FC Rapid București. The winner, after penalties, was Rapid.

Match

Details

References

External links
Romania - List of Super Cup Finals, RSSSF.com

Supercupa Romaniei, 2007
Supercupa României
2007
FC Rapid București matches
Supercupa Romaniei 2007